T.P.A.M. "Tobias" Reynaers (born 23 May 1982) is a former Dutch politician. 

Reynaers was a member of the Senate for the Party for Freedom (PVV) between 7 June 2011 and 9 June 2015. He was also a member of the Benelux Parliament. Previously, he was a municipal councillor in Roosendaal for a local party between 2010 and 2011.

Reynaers studied law at Tilburg University between 2000 and 2006. Since 2006 he has been working as a lawyer in Roosendaal.

References

External links
  Parliament.com biography

1982 births
Living people
21st-century Dutch lawyers
Members of the Senate (Netherlands)
Municipal councillors in North Brabant
Party for Freedom politicians
21st-century Dutch politicians
People from Bergen op Zoom
People from Roosendaal
Tilburg University alumni